Roqueserière-Buzet is a railway station in Occitanie, France. It is situated on the Brive–Toulouse (via Capdenac) railway line. The station is served by TER (local) services operated by SNCF.

Train services
The following services currently call at Roqueserière-Buzet:
local service (TER Occitanie) Toulouse–Albi–Rodez

References

Railway stations in Haute-Garonne